Bust of Hercules is a terracotta sculpture by Lucas Faydherbe (1617–1619) and makes part of the Van Herck Collection acquired by the King Baudouin Foundation in 1966.

Context 
Lucas Faydherbe was a sculpture from Mechelen and a pupil of Baroque painter Peter Paul Rubens. The work represents the ancient hero Hercules and is part of a series of terracotta busts that represent mythological themes and figures, making a unique part of Faydherbe's oeuvre. He is depicted wearing a lion's skin.

The work makes part of the collection King Baudouin Foundation and is on view at the Rubenshuis (Antwerp).

References

Busts (sculpture)
Terracotta sculptures
Sculptures in Belgium
Baroque sculptures